No Escape is a 1953 American film noir crime film directed by Charles Bennett starring Lew Ayres, Sonny Tufts and Marjorie Steele.

Plot
The action is set in San Francisco where the film opens in a documentary style. When evidence and circumstance in a murder case points to a young woman as the main suspect, both her boyfriend (a police detective) and a struggling songwriter who plays piano in a bar, decide to withhold evidence from the police.  Both of them ostensibly act to protect the woman, who believes that she accidentally killed the victim after an attempted sexual assault.

Later, the girl, knowing that the songwriter did not commit the murder, helps him to escape from a police dragnet when he becomes the main suspect. She and the songwriter fall in love and eventually compare notes about the events surrounding the murder, leading them to realize that someone else must be the culprit. The boyfriend is revealed as the actual murderer, and is arrested after he attempts to kill them to hide his guilt.

Cast
 Lew Ayres as John Howard Tracy
 Sonny Tufts as Det. Simon Shayne
 Marjorie Steele as Pat Peterson
 Lewis Martin as Lt. Bruce Gunning
 Gertrude Michael as Olga Valerie Lewis
 Charles Cane as Wilbur K. Grossett
 Renny McEvoy as Turnip
 Bobby Watson as Claude Duffy (as Robert Watson)
 James Griffith as Peter Hayden
 Robert Bailey as Detective Bob
 Robert Carson as Dr. Seymour

Production
The film was based on an original story by Charles Bennett. It was to be the first production from Associated Film Artists, a company formed in 1948 by publicist Whitney Bolton, actor Louis Hayward and director Edgar G. Ulmer.

In December 1949 it was announced Freddie Bisson of Independent Artists would make the film, and was hoping to star Dana Andrews and Robert Cummings.

The film was eventually made by Mattugh Productions, produced by Hugh McKenzie and Mat Freed. It was picked up for release by United Artists.

The film was going to star Louis Hayward but he dropped out when filming shifted to Los Angeles. Shooting started in January 1953.

Reception

Critical response
TV Guide gave the film a lukewarm review.  The editors wrote, "The plot seems suspenseful but the lackluster direction has no feel for thriller pacing. Things move too slowly with overwritten dialog mouthed in only average performances by the ensemble. However, the music captures the film's potential mood nicely. It's a pity the film does not live up to the score."

References

External links
 
 
 
 
 No Escape information site and DVD review at DVD Beaver (includes images)

1953 films
1950s crime thriller films
American crime thriller films
American black-and-white films
United Artists films
Film noir
Films set in San Francisco
1950s English-language films
1950s American films